KDMA may refer to:

 KDMA (AM), a radio station (1460 AM) licensed to serve Montevideo, Minnesota, United States
 KDMA-FM, a radio station (93.9 FM) licensed to serve Granite Falls, Minnesota
 Davis–Monthan Air Force Base (ICAO code KDMA), a United States Air Force base